Runglish, Ruslish, Russlish, or Russian English, is a term describing a language born out of a mixture of the English and Russian languages. This is a common among Russian speakers who speak English as a second language, and it is mainly spoken in post-Soviet States.

The earliest of these portmanteau words is Russlish, dating from 1971. Appearing later are (chronologically): Russglish (1991), Ruglish (1993), Ringlish (1996), Ruslish (1997), Runglish (1998), Rusglish (1999), and Rusinglish (2015).

Runglish is formed by adaptation of English phrases and words into Russian-style by adding affixes, with the purpose of using it in everyday communication. Runglish is a neologism used to represent at least two different combinations of Russian and English: pidgin and informal latinizations of the Cyrillic alphabet.

Although less widespread than other pidgins and creoles, such as Tok Pisin, Runglish is spoken in a number of English-Russian communities, such as in Southern Australia and most notably the Russian-speaking community of Brighton Beach in Brooklyn, New York. Brighton Beach has been nicknamed Little Odessa due to its population of Russian-speaking immigrants from Ukraine and Russia. Runglish is considered to be used and spoken by at least 130 million people. This number mainly consists of Russian-speaking immigrants and their descendants.

Origins

History 
The appearance of Runglish has been caused by a number of social, scientific and political factors from the 19th to 21st centuries.

One of the multiple causes for the blending of the two languages is the increased immigration of Russian speaking communities to the English-speaking parts of the world, and specifically the United States. The main periods of the immigration are the following:

 The Imperial Russian religious prosecutions (pogroms),
 Russian Revolution,
 Russian Civil War,
 Soviet era repressions
 Post-Soviet period.

The exposure of English to Russian speech and literature continued with the fall of the Soviet Union, as the Iron Curtain had been eliminated, which opened a possibility for international tourism and communication. Additionally important was the expansion of international contacts, the creation of partnerships and alliances in which English was the main language of communication, state computerization, and, most importantly, the introduction of the Internet.

Brighton Beach 
In the United States, Runglish is used in a number of Russian communities. Runglish is particularly popular among the Russian-speaking community in Brighton Beach in New York. Brighton Beach, a small area in New York, is rightfully considered the capital of "Russian English". Before the Great Depression, Brighton Beach used to be a fashionable destination. However, as the economic crisis progressed, luxurious life in the southern part of Brooklyn came to an end, and poor immigrants began populating it instead of wealthy European tourists. For a long time, Brighton Beach was considered to be poor, inaccessible and criminal. Soon, Brighton Beach became a home for many immigrants from all over the world, particularly from the USSR. The arrival of Russian-speaking immigrants helped to gradually develop a former disadvantaged neighbourhood into a powerful community with its own infrastructure, lifestyle and language.

The following are the examples of the Runglish words that are widely used on daily basis in Brighton Beach:

 Driving: Драйвить, Draivit (proper Russian: вести машину/ехать, vyesti mashinu/yekhat)
 Case: Kейс, Keis (proper Russian: портфель-атташе, portfel-attashe, also дело, delo as in legal case)
 Donuts: Донаты, Donaty (proper Russian: пончики, ponchiki)
 Appointments: Аппойнтменты, Appoyntmenty (proper Russian: Назначения [на приём], naznacheniya [na priyom])

NASA 

The term "Runglish" was popularized by Cosmonaut Sergei Krikalev in 2000, describing the way Russian and American cosmonauts spoke on the International Space Station. Cosmonaut Sergei Krikalev said: "We say jokingly that we communicate in 'Runglish,' a mixture of Russian and English languages, so that when we are short of words in one language we can use the other, because all the crew members speak both languages well." Ever since, NASA has begun listing Runglish as one of the on-board languages.

In culture 
Runglish is widely used in poetry (Vladimir Mayakovsky "American Russians"), music (Splean "My English-Russian dictionary") and in prose (Arthur С. Clarke's 1982 novel, 2010: Odyssey Two"). A monthly published periodical called Wind—New Zealand Russian existed from 1996 to 2003.

Literature 
A small subplot in Arthur C. Clarke's novel 2010: Odyssey Two concerned the crew of a Russo-American spaceship, who attempted to break down boredom with a Stamp Out Russlish!! campaign. As the story went, both crews were fully fluent in each other's languages, to the point that they found themselves crossing over languages in mid-conversation, or even simply speaking the other language even when there was no-one who had it as their native tongue present. Robert Heinlein’s novel The Moon is a Harsh Mistress is written in the heavily Russian-influenced English (much Russian vocabulary, some Russian grammar) of a joint Australian/Russian penal colony on the Moon.

A Clockwork Orange 
The 1962 novel A Clockwork Orange by Anthony Burgess is partially written in a Russian-influenced argot called "Nadsat", which takes its name from the Russian suffix that is equivalent to '-teen' in English. The language in the novel is a secret, used as boundary separating the teen world from the adult. There are multiple examples of the words used by teenagers in the novel:

 droog - друг - friend;
 ooko - ухо - ear;
 oomny - умный - smart;
 oozhassny - ужасный - horrible/awful;
 oozy - цепь (узы) - chain/bond;
 osoosh - осушать/вытирать - drain/wipe;
 otchkies – очки - glasses.
 korova - корова - cow (found in the movie version)
 moloko+ - молоко плюс - milk plus (found in the movie version)

Even though "Nadsat" is a fictional constructed language that is very different from Runglish, it exemplifies a common usage of a slang combining the English and Russian languages.

Examples
Word formation in Runglish have some specific features:

 Hybrids, i.e. words formed by joining the foreign roots of Russian suffixes, prefixes and endings, for example: юзать (to use - использовать), зафрендить (to befriend), пофиксить (to fix - исправить), пошерить (to share – делиться), прочекапить (to check up - проверить);
 Confusion of languages in phrases like that: забукать номер в отеле (to book – зарезервировать), зачекиниться в аэропорту (to check in – зарегистрироваться);
 Loan translation or calque, i.e. a word or phrase borrowed from another language by literal, word-for-word or root-for-root translation. For example: аккаунт (account - учетная запись), брифинг (briefing – информационное совещание), трафик (traffic – дорожное движение), спичрайтер (speechwriter – составитель текстовых речей), мануал (User's manual - инструкция по применению), адаптер (adapter – переходник), коннектор (connector – соединитель, soyedinitel), cплиттер (splitter – разветвитель, razvetvitel)
 Borrowing of English language abbreviation: АСАП (ASAP – “as soon as possible” - как можно быстрее), ИМХО (IMHO – “in my humble opinion” – по моему скромному мнению), бтв (BTW – "by the way" – если что), ЛЭД (LED – light-emitting diode; in Russian: светодиод, svyetodiod) etc.

Linguists have highlighted the following spheres, where Runglish is actively used:

 Designation of new activities and professions, e.g. «мерчендайзер» (merchandiser), «фрилансер» (freelancer), «менеджер» (manager), «супервайзер» (supervisor), «ютубер» (youtuber);
 Designation of new areas of human knowledge: «блог» (blog), «пиар» (PR), «промоушн» (promotion);
 Designation of items: «лэптоп» (laptop)/«ноутбук» ("notebook" small laptop), «мэйк-ап» (make-up), «постер» (poster), «чипы» (microchips), «чипсы» (potato chips); «Джейсэм» (GSM cell-phone network)
 Designation of terms to give them prestige: «джоб-оффер» ("job offer"), «cаттелит» ("satellite", as in "satellite city");
 Designation of musical genres: «транс» (trance), «фолк» (folk), «рэп» (rap), «эмбиент» (ambient), «ар-эн-би» (R'n'B), «фьюжн» (fusion jazz), «лаунж» (lounge music), «дип хаус» (deep house). Dmitry Kuplinov youtuber uses word «музяка» ("muzak-ah") for the background music in his streams.

Some Russian brands use an English name to imply some "Western", Occidental concept used.
 "Fix Price" chain of stores are a prime example. The chain initially introduced the "everything costs X rubles" concept of fixed price (similar to the "Everything 99 cents" stores or the "Dollar tree").

Runglish as Russians' lish 

Runglish has some peculiarities which distinguish it from regular English. That's because Russian language is a synthetic language: words in Russian use various morphemes, which depend on grammatical cases, declensions and some other traits; while, as a rule of thumb, every letter in Russian has its own only sound.

 Runglish speakers hardly make any distinction between closed/open and long/short vowels (examples: "heat" vs "hit"; "port" vs "pot"). 
 Consonants/soundless at the end of words may be confused ("leave" vs "leaf"). 
 Absence of "θ" and "ð" in Russian phonology causes mispronounceations (examples: "thing" vs "sing"; "then" vs "zen")
 "Runglish" fail to differentiate articles (а/an vs the vs zero article), as articles aren't used in Russian grammar.
 Tenses are broken in the lish, as instead of 12 tenses (3 simple tenses, 3 continuous tenses, 3 perfect tenses, 3 perfect-continuous tenses), Russian language only has 3 tenses (past, present, future).
 Russian language has "forms" instead. A verb in Russian has either perfective or imperfective aspect. Still, it is challenging for a Russian to master the difference between a simple tense and its perfect tense counterpart.
 Some prepositions are mixed up in Runglish ("during" vs "for", "in" vs "at"/"оn"). 
 It is very common for Runglish speakers to misuse double negation. ("I didn't do nothing" (instead of "I didn't do anything"); and use wrong tags ("You don't like it, do you?" - Runglisher may ambiguously answer "Yes, I don't" / "No, I like it").
 G and J may be confused in Runglish speech: programmers in Russia would often pronounce "Git" as "Jit", confusing it with another "JIT" - Just-in-time compilation technology. Another example: GSM abbreviation in Runglish sounds as "Jay Sam".
 The pronunciation of the letter R varies between many languages, and Russian is no exception: in Russian, the typical sound would be close to the "Japanese "R" sound, or "burst-like R" (to English ears, with a hint of "D") as in drilling noises. Conversely, English "R" may be hard to interpret for a Russian as "r" and not a "v/w" sound if any ("horny" vs "honey").

Transliteration-related speech issues 
Words "bat"/"bad"/"bet"/"bed" are especially difficult for Runglishers to tell apart.
 A/E letters and D/T letters can be confusing for a Russian. The "T" sound in English sounds softer, compared to Russian way to say "T"; but it's the other way round for "D". Therefore, "d" and "t" may be confused in Runglish. In fact, words like "card" and "standard" can be found in Russian "карта" and "стандарт".
 The [ Æ ] diphthong (as in "bad" or "bat") can be a problem. While Russian language has "Я" letter with its sound, close to "æ"; the letter is almost never used to transcribe that sound. Russians unironically transliterate "and" the same way they transliterate "end": "Энд". There is no strict "A with [Æ] sound in English word" gives "Э" with "eh" in the resulting word" rule, though. In some words (e.g. "caliber"/"calorie"/"bar"/"plastic"/"card"/"standard"/"bank"), Russian language replaces the "Æ"-like sounds with "cyrillic А" letter and "ɐ" sound.
 Instead, most words with "-ia", are transliterated as "-ия". Older example: malaria and малярия, recent example: Costa Concordia was immideately transliterated as Коста Конкордия.
 English words that end with "-ar" or "-arity", are introduced into Russian with "-яр" or "-ярность" respectively. This goes to the words like "singularity" and "polarity", which can be found in Russian as "сингулярность" and "полярность". 

Incidentally, there are "krem" and "lin" words in Runglish. Both words illustrate the issues with "-ea-".
 Words "cream" and "cram" are homophones in Runglish: Крем, "krem" word may refer both to creamy goods and (sometimes) to crammed second-hand clothing.
 Meanwhile, word "lean" is borrowed as Лин, "lin": corporate terms like "Lean Thinking" would be translated to Russian as Мышление Лин. As result, the word "lean" sounds like an Oriental name, rather than an Occidental noun in Runglish.

Simple past/present/future tenses 
Runglish has improper use of simple tenses (X did Y) in place of "perfect" ones (X have done Y). 
 In Russian language verbs have "forms" instead; "imperfect form" (imperfective aspect) or "perfect form" (perfective aspect). The idea of "perfect" form of a verb is used in Russian language on situations "simple" tenses in English cover (I did X = Я сделал Х); while any "imperfect" verb would be often used in situations English speaker would use "continuous" form (I was doing X = Я делал Х)

Misused negation 

"We don't need no education" line implies possible misused double negation (the additional "no" in place of "any"). Yet in Runglish, the "no" would be felt as an "additional" negation, ruining the play on words. 
 Compare to Russian: «Нам не нужно никакого образования».

Thing is, Russian language lacks a short word, similar to English "any". Russian has similes "какого либо" or "какого бы ни было" phrases, which are closer to "whichever".

Silent letters 
In Russian language, the letters with voiceless sounds (like the "e" in words like "dice" or "prone") is very rare; it may be challenging to learn proper pronunciation since the very idea of "silencing" letters may feel foreign to a person from Russia.
The exception of designated letters Ь (soft sign) and Ъ (hard sign)) only confirmates the general rules, as these two letters are "soundless", "signs".

In layman terms, Russians don't really shortcut their words; as opposed to the British practice of shortcutting "a bottle of water" to "a bo'oh o' wa'er", effectively silencing the "t" letter.

Historically defined spelling 

In Russian, it's vanishingly rare to mix letters to represent one complex sound, where 2 "usual" letters form a double-tone, let alone 3-4 letters would be used for 1 sound; a combination of those may look misleading to a Russian. Normally, Russians only use Й letter next to a vowel to form anything similar to a diphthong.

A basic example: the double "O" between "L" and "D" as in "flood" or "blood" as opposed to the double "O" as in "book", "crook", "zoomer", "doomer" or "boomer".
Russian netizens use word "flood" as "флуд" (flud)

A harder example: Borscht word (with "sch" + silent "t" due to borrowing the word from Yiddish (באָרשט)). In Russian, the same word is борщ (The Щ letter is a single letter for a specific brushy sound).

Overly "official" vocabulary 
The lish may fail to feel neutral to native English speakers, since many words, widely used in Russian in regular talk, can be perceived as official-styled: say, along with "Беречь еду" ("to save food") phrase, Russians would use "Экономить еду" (to "economy" food). However, the "рацион" word in Russian is not similar to English "rations" noun or English "to ration" verb; it is closer to a "diet" noun.

Different meanings of similar "official-sounding" words 
Such day-to-day use of "officially sounding" borrowed words instead of words native for Russian language is often called out by Russians as "канцелярит" (kan-tsee-lya-rit), basically, language people from offices would "get infected with". Runglishers use word "observe" instead of "follow" regarding adhering to rules sometimes. This is related to a similarity in Russian: "Соблюдай" (Sobludai) word for adhering to rules has the same root as "Наблюдай" (Nabludai), which indeed means observing.

 The very word "канцелярия" refers to chancery workers (e.g. office workers) in general rather than chancellors only. Therefore, the "канцелярит" joke term may be loosely translated as "office worker's soreness" or "office-itis".

Runglish in Russia 

With the increase in globalization after the dissolution of the Soviet Union, English has made its way into the language used in Russia, Ukraine, Belarus and other ex-soviet states. Runglish is used everyday when talking about politics, economics and other fields of modern life. For many people, English seems more prestigious and therefore the mixing of words help to indicate the level of education and involvement in the world community where English is dominant. Today, Runglish can be often see in various articles and news headlines of official media - «Снегопад в России: травмы, пробки и блэкаут» ("Snowstorm in Russia: injuries, traffic, and blackout"; «Снеговики, волки, сасквочи. Предшественники сочинских маскотов» ("Snowmen, wolves, and sasquatches. Predecessors of Sochi Olympics mascots").

Young people, who are known for their creativity, also are big contributors to the popularization of Runglish. The use of anglicisms has been on the rise in recent years, and is now an essential part of the youth's vocabulary.

Criticism 
The opinions of linguists on the effects of Runglish are divided. Whether some argue that incorporation of foreign words into Russian language enriches it and broadens the culture, others claim that "the large-scale penetration of English is destroying the system of the Russian language, its identity and culture".

In 2006, Vladimir Putin signed the decree "On holding a year of the Russian language". Following that, 2007 had been declared the "Year of the Russian Language" in Russia and abroad, in order to promote the importance and beauty of Russian and limit the usage of foreign words. The rector of A. Pushkin State Institute of the Russian Language Yuri Prokhorov admitted that it was impossible to stop the tendency of the widespread use of foreign terms. However, he believed that the bigger issue was that a large number of Russians could not use their own language correctly.

Redundancy 
Many words for basic items are borrowed from English by Russians, even though there already was a word for the same item in Russian. English word "hoodie" is copied by Russian clothing shops as "худи"; yet there was a word for the same item: "tolstovka" or "tolstovka s kapushonom". Or, for a piece of clothing to wear around one's neck, there is a word "manishka" in Russian, yet modern resellers of imported clothing use English word "snood" for it; making it hard to find a "manishka"-like neck protector in a Russian online store.

Alternatlively, some ideas in Russian had already been named with words from West European languages before the influence of English started. For example, English word "Sandwich" competes with German word "butterbrod" in Russian.

References

English-based pidgins and creoles
Russian-based pidgins and creoles
Macaronic forms of English
Russian-American culture
Russian-Australian culture
Russian-Canadian culture
Russian-New Zealand culture